The Cinda-Regi language (commonly known as Kamuku and also known as ‘Yara or Cinda-Regi-Kuki-Kuru-Maruba) is a language complex of Nigeria belonging to the Kamuku branch of Kainji languages.

Geographic distribution
The Kamuku language is spoken in various parts of northern Nigeria. This include Kaduna State (Birnin Gwari), Kebbi State, Kwara State, Niger State (Chanchaga, Rafi, Mariga, Kontagora and Minna) and Sokoto State (Sokoto).

Varieties
There are four main varieties: Cinda, Regi, Rogo (Orogo), and Kuki. Kuru and Maruba, both named after villages, are close to each other. Shiyabe is closely related to the Rogo language. However, Rogo can refer to two varieties, namely a Cinda-Regi variety and another non-Cinda-Regi variety (Rogo II).

Names
Names for the Cinda-Regi languages:

References

External links
Word list of terms in various dialects of Kamuku

Kamuku languages
Languages of Nigeria